Paul Micou (born 1959) is an American novelist. Born in San Francisco, he grew up in Turkey, Iran, Washington D.C. and Connecticut. After graduating from Harvard in 1981 he moved to Paris, then London. He now lives in France with his wife and two sons.  His eighth novel was published in July 2008 by Random House.

Paul Micou's first novel The Music Programme (1989) is a comic satire on the comfortable lifestyles of overpaid international development workers. Set in a fictional African country called Timbali, the novel was published to favourable reviews. The New York Times called it "an excellent, accomplished example" of satirical fiction and compared his comic talents to those of Evelyn Waugh and William Boyd.  This novel was composed as an opera by UK composer Roxanna Panufnik which premiered in 2000 at the Polish National Opera, Teatr Wielki, Warsaw.

Novels 
The Music Programme (1989)

The Cover Artist (1990)

The Death of David Debrizzi (1991)

Rotten Times (1992)

The Last Word (1993)

Adam's Wish (1994)

The Leper's Bell (2000)

Confessions of a Map Dealer (July 2008)

How to Get into Harvard (2013)

External links 
 Interview with Paul Micou at www.jour.city.ac.uk

1959 births
Harvard University alumni
American expatriates in France
20th-century American novelists
21st-century American novelists
American male novelists
Living people
20th-century American male writers
21st-century American male writers